Kim Hye-yeong ( or  ; born 26 February 1995) is a South Korean football player for Gyeongju KHNP and the South Korean national team. She participated at the 2015 FIFA Women's World Cup.

References

External links

1995 births
Living people
South Korean women's footballers
South Korea women's international footballers
2015 FIFA Women's World Cup players
WK League players
Women's association football midfielders
South Korea women's under-20 international footballers